Agelasta humeralis is a species of beetle in the family Cerambycidae. It was described by Charles Joseph Gahan in 1894. It is known from Myanmar.

References

humeralis
Beetles described in 1894